Mohammed Azeem (born 15 December 1990) also known as Azeem is an Indian reality television actor who predominantly acts in Tamil television serials. He debuted in his first soap opera in 2012 called Maya alongside actress Vani Bhojan. He later also appeared in various different serials in many television networks. He also appeared in serials such as Priyamanaval, Pagal Nilavu and Kadaikutty Singam. He is also the winner of  Bigg Boss Tamil Season 6 in 2023.

Career 
Azeem started his career as an anchor in Moon TV and later forayed as an actor in the serial Maya which aired on Jaya TV in 2012, he played the lead and the role as Ashwin alongside actress Vani Bhojan who was also the main lead in the serial. In 2013 he later shifted his career towards Star Vijay and played a crucial supporting role in the popular serial Deivam Thandha Veedu playing the role of Charan. He was praised for his acting skills in the serial and later went on to feature in other serials such as Priyamanaval, Pagal Nilavu, Niram Maaratha Pookkal and Poove Unakkaga. In 2023, Azeem won the title in the reality show Bigg Boss Tamil Season 6  which aired on Star Vijay.

Personal life 
In 2018, Azeem married his girlfriend Syed Zoya in Chennai, however in 2021 the couple decided to separate and call of their relationship and later divorced.

Television

Awards
Awards

References

External links 

 Mohammed Azeem on IMDb

Living people
Tamil male actors
Male actors in Tamil cinema
21st-century Indian male actors
Bigg Boss (Tamil TV series) contestants
Big Brother (franchise) winners
People from Kanyakumari district
1990 births